CEATSA, is an Argentine high technology testing company providing environmental testing services to the satellite, aeronautics, electronics, automotive, defense, and energy industries. It is jointly owned by the Argentine government owned telecommunications company ARSAT (80%) and public company INVAP (20%).

History
It was created in September 2010, started its operations in December 2012 and the environmental testing facilities were officially inaugurated in September 2013, when ARSAT-1 did its whole testing cycle. Its creation enabled the country to cover the whole life cycle of satellite design and operation.

The creation of CEATSA enabled Argentina to cover the whole cycle of satellite design and manufacturing. Previously, national satellites like SAC-D had to be tested on the Brazilian INPE. This was expensive since the move of personnel and ground support equipment associated with a single satellite was significant. Since the Brazilian testing facilities were too small for the size of the ARSAT satellites, it simply made economic sense to actually build the facilities.

The actual investment on the company was of approximately 40 Million US dollars.

Testing Facilities

 Environmental testing chamber
 Shaker (vibration testing)
 Reverberant Test Chamber (acoustic environment testing)
 Mass properties testing equipment
 Near Field Horizontal Scanner
 Anechoic Chambers

See also
 INVAP
 ARSAT
 ARSAT-1
 ARSAT-2
 ARSAT-3

References

External links
 CEATSA Official Page

Research and development organizations
Government-owned companies of Argentina
Science and technology in Argentina
Defense companies of Argentina
Laboratories in Argentina
Space programme of Argentina
Argentine companies established in 2010